Arza may refer to:

 Arza, small populated town and township, east of Lhasa in the Tibet Autonomous Region of China
 Donaldo Arza, Panamanian middle-distance runner
 Juan Arza Iñigo, Spanish football forward and manager
 ARZA, Association of Reform Zionists of America

See also 

 Arsa (disambiguation)
 Arzah
 Azra (disambiguation)